Andy O'Brien (21 January 1915 – 4 December 2006) was a Fine Gael politician from County Cavan in Ireland. He was a senator from 1969 to 1982, and from 1983 to 1987.

O'Brien was a teacher who served as principal of the national school in Crubany for more than 40 years. He was member of Cavan County Council and Cavan Urban District Council for over 40 years, and a leading organiser of Fine Gael in the county.

He was first elected to the 12th Seanad in 1969, on the Agricultural Panel, and re-elected in 1973 on the Administrative Panel. In 1977, he was elected to the 14th Seanad on the Labour Panel, which re-elected him in 1981. He did not contest the 1982 Seanad election, but in 1983 he was re-elected on the Labour Panel, and served until he stood down at the 1987 election.

References

1915 births
2006 deaths
Fine Gael senators
Members of the 12th Seanad
Members of the 13th Seanad
Members of the 14th Seanad
Members of the 15th Seanad
Members of the 17th Seanad
Local councillors in County Cavan